The 2022 North Carolina A&T Aggies football team represented the North Carolina A&T State University during the 2022 NCAA Division I FCS football season. The Aggies played their home games at the Truist Stadium in Greensboro, North Carolina. The team was coached by fifth-year head coach Sam Washington. This was the second and final season for the Aggies in the Big South Conference.

Previous season

The Aggies finished the 2021 season with a record of 5–6, 3–4 Big South play to finish in a 4 way tie for third place.

Schedule

Game summaries

vs North Carolina Central

at No. 1 North Dakota State

at Duke

South Carolina State

Bryant

Edward Waters

at Robert Morris

Campbell

Norfolk State

Charleston Southern

at Gardner–Webb

References

North Carolina AandT
North Carolina A&T Aggies football seasons
North Carolina AandT Aggies football